Wanbao Town is a rural town in Louxing District of Loudi City, Hunan Province, People's Republic of China.

History
In 2015, Chayuan Town was merged into Wanbao Town.

Administrative division
The town is divided into 24 villages, the following areas: Xinping Village, Zhushan Village, Wanbao Village, Longjing Village, Wangxing Village, Bajiao Village, Qunyi Village, Gaochong Village, Qingshan Village, Hushi Village, Jiangxi Village, Shibu Village, Yagu Village, Moshi Village, Xinbai Village, Qingjiang Village, Fushan Village, Datang Village, Kuangjia Village, Xinzhi Village, Dongfanghong Village, Qiaoquan Village, Shilin Village, and Fuchong Village.

Geography
The town is bordered to the north by Dake Subdistrict, to the east by Maotian Town of Xiangxiang, to the south by the towns of Hongshandian and Shexingshan, to the southwest by Hetang Town, and to the northwest by Shuidongdi Town.

Transportation

Provincial Highway
Provincial Highway S209 is a major north-south highway runs through the town.

Railway
The Luoyang–Zhanjiang Railway, from Luoyang City, Henan Province to Zhanjiang City, Guangdong Province runs through the town.

The Shanghai–Kunming high-speed railway runs west-east through the southern town.

Expressway
S70 Loudi–Huaihua Expressway, more commonly known as "Louhuai Expressway", is a west-east highway passing through the town.

References

Divisions of Louxing District